Dragonheart is a mediaeval fantasy fiction novel by Todd McCaffrey in the Dragonriders of Pern series that his mother Anne McCaffrey initiated in 1967. Published by Del Rey Books in 2008, it was the second for Todd as sole author and the twenty-second in the series. Written after his first book, Dragonsblood, it is a concurrent-time book as opposed to a prequel or sequel.

The frame story of Dragonheart takes place in a few days of winter 508 AL (years After Landing on Pern), weeks after the beginning of the Third Pass and its attendant Threadfall.

Synopsis
Pern is still trying to recover from a deadly plague that devastated the holders and craftsmen, not even 15 turns (years) before. Although the dragonsriders and weyrfolk were spared from the devastation of that plague, they are about to be tested with a deadly illness that afflicts the dragons.

Fiona of Fort Weyr, the only surviving child of Lord Holder Bemin of Fort Hold, is thrust into this situation when she accidentally impresses Gold Talenth. As first fire-lizards, and then dragons, fall prey to the mysterious illness, Fiona and all of Pern must face the possibility of no dragons being left to fight thread as it begins to fall once more.

The number of casualties mount as both the illness and thread take dragons and their riders. In an attempt to save the Weyrs, Fiona and a mysterious rider lead the injured and weyrlings back in time.

Notes

References

External links

2008 novels
2008 fantasy novels
2008 science fiction novels
Dragonriders of Pern books
Novels by Todd McCaffrey
Del Rey books